Androgen deprivation-induced senescence (or ADIS) refers to the induction of cellular senescence as a result of androgen deprivation therapy.
ADIS is observed in prostate cancer cells that are dependent on androgens for cell proliferation.  Androgen withdrawal induces cells to undergo cellular senescence by  up-regulating intracellular reactive oxygen species (ROS) that cause DNA damage.  ADIS is maintained through the up-regulation of the cell cycle regulator p16ink4a.

References 

Prostate disorders